Deborah Raney is an American writer.

Early life and education 
Raney was born in Texas and grew up in Rice County, Kansas, the eldest of five children. Growing up on a farm in Kansas, Raney was inspired by Laura Ingalls Wilder's popular Little House on the Prairie series. She graduated from Lyons High School in Lyons, Kansas and subsequently attended Emporia State University and later, Kansas State University. She and her husband, Ken, currently live in Missouri. They have four children.

Career 
After spending almost two decades as a stay-at-home mom to her and her husband's two sons and two daughters, Raney finally began work on her first novel – a contemporary story that developed out of a discussion with her husband and teenage children on Alzheimer's disease. Drawing on her experiences working in a New York nursing home early in her marriage, she crafted a fictional account of one family's struggle with Alzheimer's disease. The award-winning book, A Vow to Cherish, published by Bethany House Publishers, would go on to win the 1997 Angel Award from Excellence in Media. It has since been translated into Danish, Norwegian, Swedish and Dutch, and was also published in a hardcover large-print edition by Thorndike Press.

In 1999, the World Wide Pictures adapted the book into a screenplay that became a made-for-television movie and was aired in 200 major markets, with Raney and her husband attending the Hollywood premiere in June of that year. The movie was rebroadcast a second time in December 2004, and was subsequently released on video and DVD in seven languages. Ten years after its first publication, A Vow to Cherish was reissued in trade and mass market formats by Steeple Hill books.

After the releases of two additional novels, In the Still of the Night (Bethany House 1997) and Kindred Bond (Bethany House 1998), both of which are now out of print, Raney would pen Beneath a Southern Sky in 2001. The Waterbrook Press (Random House) novel won the 2001 Romantic Times Reviewers' Choice Award, the 2002 Inspirational Readers' Choice Award, Book of the Year for American Christian Romance Writers, and Romance Writers of America's 2002 RITA Award.

After the Rains was published by Waterbrook Press in 2002. A sequel to Beneath a Southern Sky, After the Rains also garnered numerous national recognitions. After the Rains also earned Book of the Year Honors (2003) from ACFW, was a Romantic Times Reviewers' Choice nominee (2002) and named a Top 20 Fiction book (2002) by Christian Book Distributors.

Raney's next release, Playing by Heart, a novella, was published by Barbour Books in 2003.  The plot relied on a bed-and-breakfast for its setting, and was conceived the previous autumn when Deborah retreated to write at such a B and B while on a tight deadline. Playing by Heart again earned ACFW Book of the Year honors (2004), was a 2004 Christy Award Finalist, and recognized with the National Readers Choice Award for Best Novella (2003).

Since then, Raney has written or contributed to more than forty other books, most notably her Clayburn Novels series and Hanover Falls Novels series from Howard, an imprint of Simon & Schuster, and her Chicory Inn Novels series from Abingdon Press. She served on the executive board of the 2600-member American Christian Fiction Writers for 18 years, and has been on faculty at the organization's annual writers conference since 2001. She has also served on faculty at other writers conferences, including Christian Writers Guild Write for the Soul, Oregon Christian Writers Conference, Mount Hermon Christian Writers Conference, Blue Ridge Mountains Christian Writers Conference, Colorado Christian Writers Conference, Autumn in the Mountains Novelists Retreat, and others.

With her husband, Ken Raney, she reissued many of her early books through Raney Day Press, including Beneath a Southern Sky, After the Rains, A Scarlet Cord, Because of the Rain, Above All Things, A Nest of Sparrows, A Scarlet Cord, The Face of the Earth, Insight, Over the Waters, A Vow to Cherish, Within This Circle, among other works.

Published works
A Vow to Cherish (Bethany House, 1996) 
In the Still of Night (Bethany House, 1997) 
Kindred Bond (Bethany House, 1998)
Children's Sermons to Go (Abingdon Press, 1998) 
Beneath a Southern Sky (Waterbrook Press/Random House, 2001) 
More Children's Sermons to Go Abingdon Press, 2001) 
Circle of Blessings novella in "A Currier & Ives Christmas" (Barbour Books, 2002), 
After the Rains (Waterbrook Press/Random House, 2002) 
Playing by Heart (Barbour Books, 2003) 
A Scarlet Cord (Waterbrook Press/Random House, 2003) 
A Nest of Sparrows (Waterbrook Press/Random House 2004) 
Over the Waters (Steeple Hill Books, 2005) 
Finally Home novella in "Missouri Memories" (Barbour Books, 2007) 
Within This Circle (Steeple Hill, 2007) 
CLAYBURN NOVELS SERIES
 Remember to Forget (Howard Books/Simon & Schuster, 2007) 
 Leaving November (Howard Books/Simon & Schuster, 2008) 
 Yesterday's Embers (Howard Books/Simon & Schuster, 2009) 
Insight (Steeple Hill, 2009) 
Above All Things (Steeple Hill, 2009) 
Beneath a Southern Sky (Waterbrook Press/Random House, 2010, reissue), 
"Circle of Blessings" in "A Prairie Christmas Collection" (Barbour Books, 2010, 2013) 
HANOVER FALLS NOVELS SERIES
 Almost Forever (Howard/Simon & Schuster 2010) 
 Forever After (Howard/Simon & Schuster 2011) 
 After All (Howard/Simon & Schuster 2012) 

"Face of the Earth" (Howard/Simon & Schuster 2013) 
"Silver Bells" (Summerside Press/Guideposts 2013) 
"A January Bride" (HarperCollins/Zondervan 2013, ebook, rewrite/reissue of "Playing by Heart") ASIN B00DL10HDA
"Because of the Rain" (Greenbrier Press 2014/Raney Day Press 2015, update and reissue of "In the Still of Night") 
"A January Bride" novella in "Winter Brides" (HarperCollins/Zondervan 2014, print anthology) 

CHICORY INN NOVELS SERIES
 "Home to Chicory Lane" (Abingdon Press August 2014) 
 "Two Roads Home" (Abingdon Press June 2015) 
 "Another Way Home" (Abingdon Press October 2015) 
 "Close to Home" (Abingdon Press June 2016)
 "Home at Last" (Abingdon Press February 2017)

"Right Where We Belong" (Raney Day Press April 2017)

CHANDLER SISTERS NOVELS SERIES
"Reason to Breathe" (Gilead Publishers October 2018)
"Chasing Dreams" (Kregal Publications October 2019)
"Finding Wings" (Kregel Publications October 2020)

"The Society of Second Chances" (Guideposts 2020)
"Love's Pure Light" ("Making Room at the Inn" in Christmas collection from Barbour Books 2020)
"Bridges" (Raney Day Press January 2021)
"O Little Town" ("The Wondrous Gift" in Christmas collection from Kregel Publications 2022)
"Breath of Heaven" (Raney Day Press 2022)

References

Christian novelists
Writers from Wichita, Kansas
Emporia State University alumni
Kansas State University alumni
Living people
Year of birth missing (living people)